Tolčane is a small village northeast of Fužina in the Municipality of Ivančna Gorica in central Slovenia. The area is part of the historical region of Lower Carniola and is included in the Central Slovenia Statistical Region.

References

External links

Tolčane on Geopedia

Populated places in the Municipality of Ivančna Gorica